"Are You Lonely for Me", written and produced by Bert Berns (aka Bert Russell), is a song first recorded by Freddie Scott.

The single was Scott's highest charting single on the R&B chart, hitting the number-one spot for four weeks, in early 1967.  "Are You Lonely For Me" was also Freddie Scott's second and last Top 40-hit single.  The song's back up vocals were performed by Cissy Houston and the Sweet Inspirations.

The song has been covered many times since, including renditions by Hank Ballard, Commitments, Grateful Dead, Al Green, Chuck Jackson, Steve Marriott, Otis Redding & Carla Thomas, and David Johansen. The song was a standard in the Jerry Garcia & Merl Saunders tours from 1972 to 1974. Keith Richards named it the one song he would want to be credited for writing

Chart positions

References

1966 singles
Songs written by Bert Berns
1966 songs
Shout Records singles
Song recordings produced by Bert Berns